"Strawberries" is the lead single released from Smooth's fourth and final album, Reality. The lyrics are about eating strawberries with Hennessy with  sexual overtones. The song became the most successful of Smooth's career, making it to 49 on the Billboard Hot 100 and 17 on the Hot R&B/Hip-Hop Singles & Tracks. This song contains a sample from "Where There Is Love" by Patrice Rushen.

Two remixes for the song were made. The more popular Computer remix was produced by Darren "Nitro" Clowers and featured NBA star Shaquille O'Neal and Roger Troutman. The other remix was produced by Marc Kinchen and featured Smooth's labelmate, Rufas Blaq.

Track listing

A-side
"Strawberries" (Computer Love Remix)- 5:33  
"Strawberries" (Computer Love Remix Instrumental)- 5:31  
"Strawberries"- 5:37

B-side
"Strawberries" (Marc Kinchen Remix)- 5:16  
"Strawberries" (Marc Kinchen Remix Instrumental)- 5:15  
"Strawberries" (A Capella)- 5:29

Charts

Weekly charts

Year-end charts

See also
 List of strawberry topics

References

1997 singles
Smooth (singer) songs
1997 songs
Songs written by Smooth (singer)
Strawberries